Zarubino is a rural locality (a selo) in Dzhidinsky District, Republic of Buryatia, Russia. The population was 273 as of 2010. There are 2 streets.

Geography 
Zarubino is located 71 km east of Petropavlovka (the district's administrative centre) by road. Dyrestuy and Dzhida are the nearest rural localities.

References 

Rural localities in Dzhidinsky District